Massala may refer to:

Places
 Massala, Ivory Coast, a sub-prefecture of Séguéla Department, Worodougou region, Woroba District, Ivory Coast
 Massala, Mali, a village in Mali
 Massala-Barala, a settlement in Touba Department, Bafing Region, Woroba District, Ivory Coast

Other uses 
 Adisu Massala, Israeli politician
 , Gabonese diplomat 
 Massala (moth), a genus of moths of the family Erebidae
 Massala, historic apartment building located at Indianapolis, Indiana, United States of America

See also 

 Masala (disambiguation)